The Renfe Class 130 or S-130<ref>From Serie 130 de Renfe</ref> (Spanish: Serie 130 de Renfe, manufacturer's designation Talgo 250) is a high-speed dual-gauge, dual-voltage trainset consisting of 11 Talgo VII tilting coaches and two power cars, used on Alvia services.Trayectos y Servicios - clase turista www.renfe.es The class have been nicknamed patitos (ducklings), due to the shape of the train nose.

Background and design
The trainsets are designed for high-speed services on Iberian gauge and high-speed lines; they can change gauge at low speed without stopping using Talgo's RD variable gauge system. The carriages are constructed from aluminium and incorporate the Talgo Pendular passive pendulum tilting system, are sealed against pressure differences for tunnel travel, and have underframe air conditioning, individual audio systems and video displays, rotating and reclining seats and power outlets.

Capacity in standard class is 36 seated, in first class 26 seats, end coaches have lower capacity, one coach is typically used for restaurant/sales services.

The power cars use AC traction motors controlled by IGBT inverters which include integrated auxiliary inverters. Signalling systems can include ETCS Level 2, LZB, ASFA and Ebicab900TBS.

Operations and services
As of January 2010 they operated from Gijon/Oviedo via León, Palencia, Valladolid to Madrid with some trains extended to Alicante via Albacete;Nuestros Trenes . Alvia Serie 130 www.renfe.com Santander via Palencia and Valladolid to Madrid, sometimes extended to Alicante;Alvia service : Santander-Alicante www.renfe.es  Madrid to Bilbao via Valladolid and Burgos;Alvia service : Madrid-Bilbao www.renfe.es  Madrid to San Sebastian/Irun via Valladolid, Burgos and Vitoria;Alvia service : Madrid-Irun www.renfe.es Madrid to Alicante;Alvia service : Madrid-Alicante www.renfe.es  Huelva and Cadiz and Madrid to Murcia.

On services such as Gijon-Madrid they have been replaced by Renfe Class 120 trainsets (2011).

Developments

Renfe Class 730

In order to extend high-quality services to parts of Spain not on the high-speed network Renfe acquired hybrid trains with both electric and diesel power for delivery in 2012 for use from Madrid to Murcia and Galicia, built by Talgo and Bombardier, at a cost of 78 million euro. The new trains based on the S-130 were initially coded S130H, later S730;

Fifteen sets S-130 units will be converted to hybrid operation.Serie 730 de Renfe, el tren dual de Talgo todo terreno 6/10/2011 via libre with two generator cars per set using MTU 12V 4000 R43L engines (1.8MW each). The top speed in diesel mode is 180 km/h. Testing of the trains took place in 2011 with introduction into service expected in 2012.

250km/h+ prototype train
A gauge-changing train capable of over 250 km/h is in development and is based on the S-130.

Uzbekistan trainset order
A version of the S130 for Uzbekistan Temir Yollari was ordered in 2009 for use on a  Tashkent–Samarkand high-speed line. Deliveries of the order of two trains began in July 2011.

Two more sets were constructed in 2017, following expansion of the service.

Accidents and incidents 

The train involved in the Santiago de Compostela accident was a Renfe 730 series, close related to Renfe 130 series.

 See also 
 ICE trains
 ICE 1
 ICE 2
 ETR 500
 TGV trains
 TGV Sud-Est
 TGV Atlantique
 TGV Reseau
 TGV POS
 TGV Duplex
 Euroduplex
 Thalys PBA
 TGV TMST
 List of high-speed trains
 Stamps with Renfe Class 130

References

Other sources
Talgo 250 information sheet www.talgo.esInformation on the crash absorption and coupling module of the S130 powerheads www.esytech.deExternal links

Renfe Serie 130 Information from www.ferropedia.es''

Alvia high-speed trains
Passenger trains running at least at 250 km/h in commercial operations
Electric multiple units of Spain
Electric multiple units with locomotive-like power cars
25 kV AC multiple units
3000 V DC multiple units